The Jantzen Beach Carousel, also known as the C. W. Parker Four-Row Park Carousel, is a carousel formerly installed at Portland, Oregon's Jantzen Beach, in the United States.

History
The carousel was built circa 1904 by C. W. Parker in Abilene, Kansas, for use at the 1904 St. Louis World's Fair.  It was later moved to Venice Beach, California, where it began operating in 1921. In 1928, the carousel was repossessed and its parts were relocated to Portland for the opening of Jantzen Beach Amusement Park. Since then, the park became a shopping mall, Jantzen Beach Center. The carousel was removed during the mall's $50 million renovation in 2012, and reportedly remains in storage on site.

In 1987, the carousel was listed on the National Register of Historic Places, along with four others. However, it was delisted in 2008 because of plans for relocation to the Portland Children's Museum, which never came to fruition. The carousel has been designated "endangered" by the Architectural Heritage Center. In 2012, it was included in the Historic Preservation League of Oregon's list of Oregon's Most Endangered Places.

2015 sale and restoration
In 2015, the mall's owner, a company called Edens, said the carousel was being "safely stored in a camera-monitored, climate-controlled" building at the shopping center. However, in early 2017, The Oregonian reported that the current owner and location of the carousel were unknown; Edens said the carousel was sold to Kimco Realty, while the latter company claimed its purchase of Jantzen Beach Center included the land and buildings, but not the carousel.

On September 7, 2017, it was made public that the carousel had been donated in spring 2017 to Restore Oregon, a nonprofit organization; the donation had been kept private until the transfer was complete.

See also

 List of carousels on the National Register of Historic Places
 List of Oregon's Most Endangered Places
 National Register of Historic Places listings in North Portland, Oregon

References

External links
 Jantzen Beach Carousel at Restore Oregon

1904 establishments in Missouri
1921 establishments in California
1928 disestablishments in California
1928 establishments in Oregon
2012 disestablishments in Oregon
Carousels in California
Carousels on the National Register of Historic Places in Oregon
Former National Register of Historic Places in Oregon
National Register of Historic Places in Portland, Oregon
Oregon's Most Endangered Places
Venice, Los Angeles